Jason John (born 17 October 1971) is a male retired English athlete who competed in the sprinting events.

Athletics career
John represented Great Britain at the 1992 Barcelona Olympics and won a silver medal in the 4 x 100 metres relay at the 1993 World Championships (he ran in the heats and semis but not the final). He also won a silver medal at the 1996 European Indoor Championships and reached the final at the 1993 World Indoor Championships. In addition, he represented his country at two World Championships, in 1993 and 1995.

He represented England and won a bronze medal in the 4 x 100 metres relay event, at the 1994 Commonwealth Games in Victoria, British Columbia, Canada.

Personal life
Born in Birmingham, he attended Handsworth Grammar School, and went on to become an English and P.E teacher at Anthony Gell School.

Competition record

Personal bests
Outdoor
100 metres – 10.23 (+1.2 m/s) (London 1994)
200 metres – 20.86 (+0.6 m/s) (Birmingham 1995)

Indoor
60 metres – 6.60 (Birmingham 1993)
200 metres – 21.25 (Toronto 1993)

References

1971 births
Living people
British male sprinters
English male sprinters
Sportspeople from Birmingham, West Midlands
Athletes (track and field) at the 1992 Summer Olympics
Athletes (track and field) at the 1994 Commonwealth Games
Commonwealth Games medallists in athletics
Commonwealth Games bronze medallists for England
Olympic athletes of Great Britain
Medallists at the 1994 Commonwealth Games